FleXML is an XML transformation language originally developed by Kristofer Rose.  It allows a programmer to specify actions in C programming language or C++, and associate those actions with element definitions in an XML DTD.  It is similar in philosophy to Yacc and the Lex programming tool in that it is a syntax-directed driver; one could establish the analogies Yacc:LR(1) grammar::Lex:Regular grammar::FleXML::XML.

The implementation is in Perl. A programmer supplied action file is input to FleXML; the output is a file suitable for input to Flex lexical analyser.

External links 
 FleXML home page

XML-based standards